John Sheridan Weller (November 1, 1866 in Southampton Township, Somerset County, Pennsylvania – September 26, 1944 in Pittsburgh) was an attorney and politician.

He was the son of Frederick Simon Weller and Mary Ann Hammer and attended Bedford County Public Schools. He married Sara Barbara Mercer. The couple had no children.

He graduated from Pennsylvania State College as a civil engineer in 1889 and began working for the U.S. National Geodetic Survey. After reading for his law examinations, he was admitted to the bar of Bedford County in 1891. From 1894 to 1897 he served as district attorney for Bedford County, and in 1898 was elected a member of the Pennsylvania State Senate from the 36th District. In autumn of 1901, he moved to Pittsburgh, where he became a partner in the law firm Weller, Wicks and Wallace. In this capacity, he frequently represented Mike Benedum, who together with Joe Trees developed oil fields by gaining leases for exploration and drilling. He specialized in the laws governing oil and gas properties.

Pennsylvania lawyers
People from Somerset County, Pennsylvania
1866 births
1944 deaths